Fernando Marçal de Oliveira (born 19 February 1989) is a Brazilian professional footballer who plays as a left wing-back for Campeonato Brasileiro Série A club Botafogo.

Career
After playing for Grêmio and Guaratinguetá in Brazil, Marçal headed to Portugal. In 2010, he signed for Torreense in the Portuguese Second Division. He made 40 appearances for the club before signing for Nacional in Primeira Liga. After amassing over 80 appearances at Nacional, his performances attracted the interest of 2014–15 Primeira Liga champions Benfica, who subsequently signed him on a five-year contract.

On 20 August 2015, Marçal was loaned out to Turkish side Gaziantepspor for a season.

On 16 June 2017, he signed for French club Olympique Lyonnais for €4.5 million after a stint with rival club Guingamp, where he made seven assists in 31 league appearances.

On 6 September 2020, Marçal moved to English side Wolverhampton Wanderers for a fee of €2 million on a two-year deal. Marçal made his full debut for Wolves on 14 September 2020 in a Premier League game away to Sheffield United.

In May 2022, Wolves manager Bruno Lage confirmed Marçal's departure at the end of the 2021–22 season. On 16 June 2022, he signed for Brazilian club Botafogo on a contract until the end of the 2023 season, with an option for a further season. Marçal was handed the number 21 jersey at the club.

Career statistics

Honours
Benfica
Supertaça Cândido de Oliveira: 2016
Lyon

 Coupe de la Ligue runner-up: 2019–20

References

External links

 
 

1989 births
Living people
Footballers from São Paulo
Association football defenders
Brazilian footballers
Grêmio Foot-Ball Porto Alegrense players
Guaratinguetá Futebol players
S.C.U. Torreense players
C.D. Nacional players
S.L. Benfica footballers
Gaziantepspor footballers
En Avant Guingamp players
Olympique Lyonnais players
Wolverhampton Wanderers F.C. players
Botafogo de Futebol e Regatas players
Primeira Liga players
Segunda Divisão players
Ligue 1 players
Süper Lig players
Premier League players
Campeonato Brasileiro Série A players
Brazilian expatriate footballers
Expatriate footballers in Portugal
Brazilian expatriate sportspeople in Portugal
Expatriate footballers in Turkey
Brazilian expatriate sportspeople in Turkey
Expatriate footballers in France
Brazilian expatriate sportspeople in France